Even though intimacy has been broadly defined in terms of romantic love and sexual desire, the neuroanatomy of intimacy needs further explanation in order to fully understand their neurological functions in different components within intimate relationships, which are romantic love, lust, attachment, and rejection in love.  Also, known functions of the neuroanatomy involved can be applied to observations seen in people who are experiencing any of the stages in intimacy.  Research analysis of these systems provide insight on the biological basis of intimacy, but the neurological aspect must be considered as well in areas that require special attention to mitigate issues in intimacy, such as violence against a beloved partner or problems with social bonding.

Components of intimacy and neuroanatomy

Attachment
Pair bonding, or intense social attachment, normally initiates partner preference in sexual situations and monogamy in many mammalian species.  Monogamous species generally exhibit an exclusive responsibility to each other as well as co-parenting to their offspring.  Studies using monogamous prairie voles (Microtus ochrogaster) showed that forming a pair bond stimulated the mesolimbic dopaminergic pathway.  In this pathway, dopamine is released from the ventral tegmental area (VTA) to the nucleus accumbens and prefrontal cortex, which then signals the ventral pallidum to complete reward processing in the pathway.      

Two important neuropeptides that mediated pair bond formation were oxytocin and arginine vasopressin (AVP).  Even though both males and females have both molecules, oxytocin was shown to be predominantly in females and vasopressin predominantly promoted pair bonding in males.  Receptor specificity was shown essential for mating by activating the dopamine D2 receptors in the nucleus accumbens in both male and female prairie voles.  Other locations that were also activated in the study were gender specific, such as oxytocin receptors (OTR) in the prefrontal cortex and AVP 1a receptors (V1aR) in the ventral pallidum.

Romantic love
Romantic love is described as involving an individual who pays closer attention to another individual in special ways, involving attention on traits worthy to pursue.  Through functional magnetic resonance imaging (fMRI), studies have shown that the right ventral tegmental area (VTA) is stimulated when subjects are shown a picture of their beloved.  As part of the reward mechanism, the VTA signals to other parts of the brain, such as the caudate nucleus to release dopamine for reward.  

Older studies have generally attributed love to the limbic system consisting of the temporal lobes, hypothalamus, amygdala as well as the hippocampus.  These functional components of the limbic system are important components of emotional processing, motivation, and memory.  Specifically, current research also suggests components, such as the hypothalamus, as playing a role in romantic love because it possesses the penchant for bonding in mammals by secreting the neuropeptides, oxytocin and vasopressin. Other research has implicated nerve growth factor (NGF), a neurotrophin that is fundamental in the neuron survival and development in the nervous system, in early-stage romantic love in subjects experiencing euphoria and emotional dependency, which is often a characteristic in romantic love.

Lust
Lust, also known as libido, is defined as pursuing sexual gratification.  It is primarily driven by the endocrine system, but the brain is also involved in neural processing.  Specifically, the hypothalamic–pituitary–gonadal (HPG) and hypothalamic–pituitary–adrenal (HPA)  axes play primary roles in the priming for sex as well as the stress response, respectively.  Because intimacy is motivated by the reward system, steroid hormones activate desire to promote partner preference and social attachment in the process of sexual union. Dopamine is then released when an individual is aroused, which associates lust as a product of the dopaminergic reward system.

However, interactions of sex and romantic love do not have the same goal orientation, which helps to confirm the difference in brain activation patterns.  Contrasting with the primary goal of romantic love, copulation can occur without two individuals being in romantic love or having a monogamous bond.  Sometimes, copulation might not even occur in romantic love relationships.  However, it still does play a role in successful reproduction when it is supplemented with romantic love.

Rejection in love
Rejection in love is considered unrequited or unreciprocated love.  Separation from a loved one can cause grief and sometimes lead to an individual expressing characteristics of depression.  In a study, symptoms seen in nine women who had experienced a recent breakup suggested involvement of certain neuroanatomy. Eating, sleeping, and neuroendocrine regulation was associated with the hypothalamus, anhedonia was associated with the ventral striatum and the amygdala was associated with emotional processing in these women.   

Other neuroanatomy that registered unrequited love included the cerebellum, insular cortex, anterior cingulate cortex, and prefrontal cortex.  All of the areas that were activated showed decreased activity when subjects emotionally reflected about the beloved rejecter. 
  
In contrast, another study observed significant increase in activation in the VTA as well as the nucleus accumbens.  Further, those rejected in love had higher stimulation in the right nucleus accumbens and ventral putamen/pallidum compared to subjects who were in romantic love   This study ultimately showed that areas that are activated in romantic love are also activated in rejection in love.  Results from this study suggest that rejected lovers have same stimulation of brain regions because they are still "in love" with their rejecters.  Since romantic love follows the dopaminergic reward system, the anticipatory nature of receiving a reward as well as deciding on losses and gains in decision making, allows the neural circuitry to become adaptable.  This allows the rejected to change their behavior through two stages.  The first is the "protest" stage where they try to win back the rejecter.  The second stage or the "rejection" stage is where they feel resignation and despair, eventually leading to continuing life without the rejecter. On the other hand, the involvement of the reward gain/loss pathways intrinsic to survival provides insight on behaviors of stalking, suicide, obsessiveness and depression.

Other neurological implications of intimate brain systems

Mother–child pair bond
An attachment between a mother and child arises from behavioral changes during birth, which includes lactation.  Release of oxytocin is important in the birthing process for the mother–child pair bond to occur in both individuals. Lactation relies on the constant release of oxytocin for the release of milk in the breast, which strengthens the first social bond of the infant and the mother.

Although this is considered another type of social attachment that activates the same reward system, maternal attachment activates different regions of the brain compared to those in partner attachment.  In one study, overlap of activated brain regions with romantic love was found to include the nucleus accumbens, putamen, caudate nucleus, which are important in social attachment.  However, the only regions that were specific to maternal love were the orbitofrontal and lateral prefrontal cortex as well as the occipital and lateral fusiform cortex.  Moreover, oxytocin is important between the mother and her offspring, so it is suggested that oxytocin deficiency can influence how successfully the offspring is able to form a monogamous pair bond with another individual in the future. This may provide insight on issues with formation of pair bonds as well as psychological problems from an inefficient upbringing.

Addictiveness

Love activates the same neural circuitry as maladaptive drugs, such as cocaine. Dopaminergic reward pathways are involved to elicit a response of gaining a reward and reinforcement, thereby leading some researchers to believe that love is addictive.  Love and drugs of abuse stimulate similar levels of dopamine for reward and reinforcement from the VTA. Actions between the two mental states are very similar with those in love experiencing excessive exhilaration, insomnia, anxiety, and loss of appetite also seen in drug users. Also, brain activity observed through single-photon emission computed tomography (SPECT) showed that dopamine release in the basal ganglia of a subject who was romantically in love appeared similar to a subject addicted to cocaine.  Although love is suggested to be addictive based on its neurological circuitry, it cannot be simplified as addictive because it is expressed in different ways across a wide spectrum.

Gender differences in the intimate brain

Emotional processing
The amygdala, a key player in emotional processing, is suggested different between men and women.  In males, emotions are considered to be primarily directed from the right hemisphere; on the other hand, it is primarily directed from the left hemisphere in females.

One study that tested positively and negatively valenced words on both male and female subjects found that emotional processing was indeed gender specific. In males, positively valenced words activated the left sensimotor cortex, angular gyrus, left hippocampus, left frontal eye field and the right cerebellum, while females had activations in the right putamen, right superior temporal gyrus, left supramarginal gyrus, left inferior frontal gyrus and the left sensorimotor cortex.  By contrast, negatively valenced words stimulated greater activation in the right supramarginal gyrus in males, while greater activation in the left part of the hippocampus with negative stimuli. Therefore, different brain regions in males and females could allude to differential responses emotional processing in intimate situations.

Jealousy

Known as the insecure feeling of a partner in regards to losing their loved one to another,  jealousy can result in extreme situations such as violence and abuse from the insecure partner to their beloved.  In one study, men and women were shown sentences that suggested sexual and emotional infidelity and rated the intensity of jealousy that they felt.

Sexual infidelity
In males, activation of brain areas that were induced by sexual infidelity laden statements included the visual cortex, middle temporal gyrus, amygdala, hippocampus, and claustrum.  In females, the visual cortex, middle frontal gyrus, thalamus, and cerebellum were activated.  It was found that males showed more stimulation in the amygdala in regards to sexual infidelity, while females showed greater activation in the visual cortex and thalamus.  The regions in the male brain provided insight on neuroanatomy associated with sexual and aggressive behavior.  These regions could be studied further in increased violent cases against partners, which are commonly due to male aggression.

Emotional infidelity
In males, the visual cortex, medial frontal gyrus, middle frontal gyrus, precentral gyrus, cingulate cortex, insula, hippocampus, thalamus, caudate, hypothalamus, and cerebellum were shown to be activated.  In females, activations in the visual cortex, medial frontal gyrus, middle frontal gyrus, angular gyrus, thalamus, and cerebellum were noted. Male activations were greater in the precentral gyrus, insula, hippocampus, hypothalamus, and cerebellum, while women shower greater activations in the visual cortex, angular gyrus, and thalamus.  Regions in the female brain have been implicated in detection of intention, deception, and trustworthiness of others. It is ultimately suggested that the different emotional processing in males and females contributes to the different responses in issues in intimate relationships.

References

External links 
 The Chemistry Between Us: Larry Young at TEDxEmory

Intimate relationships
Interpersonal relationships
Sociobiology
Neuroanatomy
Love